Hidehiko Tanizawa (born 5 December 1971) is a Japanese former professional tennis player.

Tanizawa, a left-handed player, won a national title as a 17-year old in 1989, when he defeated Tsuyoshi Fukui in the final of the All Japan Tennis Championships. In 1990 he featured in a Davis Cup tie against India in Chandigarh, to become Japan's youngest ever Davis Cup debutant. He lost his two singles rubbers, to Zeeshan Ali and Srinivasan Vasudevan. This was his only Davis Cup appearance and he continued competing in professional tournaments until 1996.

See also
List of Japan Davis Cup team representatives

References

External links
 
 
 

1971 births
Living people
Japanese male tennis players
Sportspeople from Nagoya
20th-century Japanese people